meta-Cresol, also 3-methylphenol, is an organic compound with the formula CH3C6H4(OH).  It is a colourless, viscous liquid that is used as an intermediate in the production of other chemicals. It is a derivative of phenol and is an isomer of p-cresol and o-cresol.

Production
Together with many other compounds, m-cresol is traditionally extracted from coal tar, the volatile materials obtained in the production of coke from (bituminous) coal. This residue contains a few percent by weight of phenol and isomeric cresols. In the cymene–cresol process, toluene is alkylated with propylene to give isomers of cymene, which can be oxidatively dealkylated analogous to the cumene process. Another method, involves carbonylation of a mixture of methallyl chloride and acetylene in the presence of nickel carbonyl.

Applications 
m-Cresol is a precursor to numerous compounds. Important applications include:

 pesticides such as fenitrothion and fenthion
 synthetic vitamin E by methylation to give 2,3,6-trimethylphenol
 antiseptics, such as amylmetacresol
 a solvent for polymers. For example, polyaniline is cast from a solution of m-cresol to form a polyaniline film with a superior conductivity than polyaniline alone. This phenomenon is known as secondary doping.
preservatives in some insulin preparations 
the starting point in the total synthesis of thymol, an important synthetic chemical for regions lacking natural sources of the flavor compound:
 C7H8O + C3H6  C10H14O
synthesis of dicresulene and policresulen
synthesis of toliprolol, tolamolol & cresatin

Natural occurrences 
m-Cresol is a component found in temporal glands secretions during musth in male African elephants (Loxodonta africana).

m-Cresol is a constituent of tobacco smoke.

m-Cresol is a component found in secretions from the ant Colobopsis saundersi during Autothysis.

See also 
 Cresol

References

External links 
 NIOSH Pocket Guide to Chemical Hazards cdc.gov
 Chemical and physical properties chemicalbook.com

Cresols